PPAP may refer to:

 Production part approval process, an automotive supply chain process
 (-)-1-Phenyl-2-propylaminopentane, a stimulant drug
 "PPAP (Pen-Pineapple-Apple-Pen)", a 2016 single and viral video by Japanese singer and comedian Pikotaro

See also
 PEPAP (phenethylphenylacetoxypiperidine), an opioid analgesic